Whitney Gaskell (born 1972) is an American author of eight comedic novels published by Bantam Books.

Biography
Whitney Gaskell was born on February 8, 1972, in Syracuse, New York.  She attended Jamesville-DeWitt High School, and earned her Bachelor of Arts degree from Syracuse University in 1994. She then attended Tulane Law School, where she was a member of the Tulane Law Review.  She served for two years as a law clerk to Paul Womack of the Texas Court of Criminal Appeals, and practiced briefly as a litigator before publishing her first novel, Pushing 30, in 2003.

Gaskell is represented by the Ethan Ellenberg Literary Agency.

Gaskell is also the author of the Geek High series of young adult novels published by Penguin Books, writing under the pseudonym Piper Banks.

Gaskell lives in South Florida.

Novels

Pushing 30 (2003)
Ellie Winters is dependable and loyal, but has an aversion to conflict. As her thirtieth birthday approaches, she feels uneasy about her life. She has broken up with her boyfriend, despises her job, is irritated by her dysfunctional family, and controlled by her "demanding" pet pug Sally.

After a botched attempt to color her hair at home, Ellie rushes to the drugstore for emergency bleach, Sally in tow. Sally is accosted by a dog owned by another drugstore customer—television news anchor Ted Langston.  He is witty, intriguing, and attractive, but he's twice her age. The novel concerns their unorthodox May–December romance, and the obstacles they encounter.

True Love (and Other Lies) (2004)
Travel writer Claire Spencer is seated next to an attractive man, Jack, on a flight from New York to London. She is surprised when he asks her out on a date, since she considers herself to be unattractive because of her unusual height.  She is skeptical, but soon finds herself happy at how fast their relationship is moving.

While in London, on assignment for Sassy Seniors! magazine, Claire is also looking forward to seeing her best friend, Maddy, whom men have always found to be extremely attractive. For the first time in Maddy's trouble-free life, she has just been dumped. Claire then discovers that Maddy's ex-boyfriend is Jack.

Claire struggles with the moral dilemma of finally having met what seems to be the perfect guy, but betraying her best friend.

She Myself & I (2005)
The three Cassel sisters have little in common. Paige, the oldest, is a divorce attorney reeling from her own failed marriage. Middle sister Sophie is having trouble adjusting to life as a wife and expectant mother. Mickey, the youngest, is a medical student has an unorthodox plan for her future that will upset her family.

The novel also concerns the sisters' parents who, despite their bitter divorce, have begun dating each other again.  The novel follows the relationship and career difficulties of each of the three sisters, and their ultimate reconciliation as a family.

Testing Kate (2006)
Kate Bennett has played by the rules her whole life, but has been troubled by extraordinary bad luck. Orphaned while in college, Kate handled her loss by graduating with honors and acquiring a secure job and a dependable boyfriend. But as her thirtieth birthday approaches,  Kate makes the unexpected and atypical decision to take a risk—she quits her job, breaks up with her long-term boyfriend, and drives across the country for her first year at Tulane Law School.

Kate finds her life turned upside down by a sadistic law professor.  She also finds that, for the first time in her life, there are two men who want to marry her. The novel follows Kate's decision to change her lifelong pattern of playing it safe.

Mommy Tracked (2007)
Mommy Tracked concerns four women—Anna, Grace, Juliet, and Chloe—who, despite their comfortable lives in the idyllic town of Orange Cove, Florida, struggle with balancing the challenges of motherhood.

Anna is a divorced mother of a two-year-old son, and a career as a restaurant critic, but is afraid of reentering the dating scene.

Grace has three beautiful daughters and the perfect husband, but becomes increasingly obsessed with her excess weight.

Juliet is an ambitious lawyer eager to make partner at her law firm, while her husband stays home with their twins. Juliet finds herself attracted to a colleague.

Chloe is a new mother, but her husband seems indifferent to parenting their son. Chloe is so overwhelmed that she begins compulsively shoplifting.

Booklist described Mommy Tracked as "poignant, funny, and peppered with snappy dialogue."

Good Luck (2008)
Lucy Parker wins the lottery on the worst day of her life—she discovers that her boyfriend is cheating on her, and that her career as a high school teacher is derailed by a false allegation of sexual impropriety with a student. The lottery winnings and allegation of misconduct combine to put Lucy in the center of a media frenzy.

Lucy escapes her chaotic life by fleeing to Palm Beach and staying with an old friend from college. While living in a tropical paradise with other millionaires, Lucy acquires a new hair color, a new social set, and enough anonymity to put her notoriety behind her. Soon she's courted by two men who don’t know her history. As Lucy begins to envision a new life for herself, the tabloid press catches up with her. The novel follows Lucy's struggles to return to a normal life and rediscover her values.

When You Least Expect It (2010)
The novel concerns India and Jeremy Halloway, a young happily married couple with creative careers, living a remodeled bohemian cottage in a historic West Palm Beach neighborhood.  Despite their comfortable lives, they desperately want to start a family. After two years of failed fertility treatments, they are cash-strapped and no closer to parenthood. They begin to look into adoption.

Lainey Walker dreams of moving to Los Angeles and becoming a reality-TV star. But when she has an unexpected pregnancy, she finds herself homeless and alone when her unsupportive boyfriend kicks her out of their apartment.

The Halloways and Lainey are matched through an adoption agency, but Lainey's lack of stable housing poses a problem. India proposes an unorthodox solution—that for the duration of her pregnancy, Lainey will move into the small back-house that serves as Jeremy's home office.

The novel follows the difficulties of the planned adoption as the three live in close quarters with one another.

Table for Seven (2013)
Table for Seven is a novel about a group of friends who take turns hosting the Table for Seven Dinner Party Club—a monthly lavish dinner party.

Founding members Fran and Will Parrish face the possibility that their comfortable marriage may not be as infallible as they once thought. Audrey is a young widow struggling with the difficulties of moving on. Jaime is a perfectionist who suspects that her husband, Mark, might be having an affair. Coop is a flirtatious bachelor who unexpectedly falls in love for the first time in his life. Leland, an elderly widower, is a retired judge who offers the younger members the benefit of his experience.

The novel is divided into 12 chapters, each concerning one meeting of the monthly club.  Over the course of a year, each of the seven main characters faces a life-altering challenge.

References

Sources
 Profile of Whitney Gaskell at Syracuse.com
 Whitney Gaskell at Random House
 Author Page for Whitney Gaskell at Goodreads.com
 Interview at Exploring Womanhood
 Interview at Bookreporter.com
 Interview at Chicklitbooks.com

External links
 Official website

1972 births
Living people
21st-century American novelists
American women novelists
American chick lit writers
American women lawyers
Tulane University Law School alumni
Writers from Syracuse, New York
21st-century American women writers
People from DeWitt, New York
Novelists from New York (state)
Lawyers from Syracuse, New York